Day wear, day attire, or day dress may refer to:
 Day dress or morning dress, a dress code in Western dress codes
 Black lounge suit, a men's day attire semi-formal intermediate of a formal morning dress and an informal lounge suit

See also
 Full dress uniform, a permitted supplementary alternative equivalent to the civilian morning dress for day wear 
 Casual wear